Christophe Mengin (born 3 September 1968 in Cornimont) is a retired French racing cyclist and a former cyclo-cross racer. He became professional in 1995, signing to the Chazal team, and retired after the 2008 season. His height is 1.73 m, and weight is 68 kg.

Major results
Sources:

1988
  U23 National cyclo-cross champion
1990
 1st Grand Prix Adrie van der Poel
1991
 1st Manx International GP
1993
 6th Overall Course de la Paix
1st Stage 8
 8th Mediterranean Games RR
1994
 1st Overall Circuit de Lorraine
 3rd  World Amateur Road race
 3rd Overall Rothaus Regio Tour
 4th Overall Österreich-Rundfahrt
1st Stage 3
1995
 2nd GP de la Ville de Rennes
 4th Paris–Camembert
 9th Grand Prix de Plumelec-Morbihan
1996
 6th Overall Tour de Picardie
1997
  National cyclo-cross champion
 1st Stage 16 Tour de France
 1st Stage 1 Driedaagse van De Panne-Koksijde
 5th Overall 4 Jours de Dunkerque
 5th Overall Circuit de Lorraine
 7th Omloop Het Volk
 10th De Brabantse Pijl
1998
  National cyclo-cross champion
 1st Grand Prix Adrie van der Poel
 1st Stage 3 Vuelta a Castilla y León
 6th Cyclassics Hamburg
 7th De Brabantse Pijl
 10th Classic Haribo
1999
 1st GP Ouest France - Plouay
 4th Kuurne–Brussels–Kuurne
2000
 9th Giro Provincia di Siracusa
2001
 5th Route Adélie de Vitré
 7th Cholet-Pays de Loire
2002
 6th Overall Tour of Qatar
2003
 1st Cholet-Pays de Loire
 4th GP Ouest France - Plouay
 7th Overall Driedaagse van De Panne-Koksijde
 7th GP de Villers-Cotterêts
 8th Overall Tour de Picardie
2004
 2nd Tro-Bro Léon
2006
 9th Paris–Roubaix
 9th Overall La Tropicale Amissa Bongo
2007
 1st Stage 4 Étoile de Bessèges
 5th Gent–Wevelgem
2008
 3rd Boucles de l'Aulne

References

External links 
   Christophe Mengin dans le Tour de France 
Official Tour de France results for Christophe Mengin

1968 births
Living people
Sportspeople from Vosges (department)
Cyclo-cross cyclists
French male cyclists
French Tour de France stage winners
Cyclists from Grand Est